Diploschistes (crater lichen) is a genus of crustose lichens  with a thick, cracked (areolate) body (thallus) with worldwide distribution. The fruiting part (apothecia) are immersed in the thick thallus so as to have the appearance of being small "craters".

It is in the family Thelotremataceae. The widespread genus contains about 43 species. Johannes Musæus Norman described the genus in 1853.

Selected species
Diploschistes actinostomus 
Diploschistes aeneus 
Diploschistes albopruinosus 
Diploschistes almbornii 
Diploschistes caesioplumbeus 
Diploschistes candidissimus 
Diploschistes cinereocaesius 
Diploschistes conceptionis 
Diploschistes diacapsis 
Diploschistes diploschistoides 
Diploschistes elixii 
Diploschistes euganeus 
Diploschistes farinosus 
Diploschistes gypsaceus 
Diploschistes gyrophoricus 
Diploschistes hensseniae 
Diploschistes microsporus 
Diploschistes muscorum 
Diploschistes neutrophilus 
Diploschistes scruposus 
Diploschistes sticticus 
Diploschistes thunbergianus 
Diploschistes tianshanensis 
Diploschistes wui 
Diploschistes xinjiangensis

References

Ostropales
Lichen genera
Ostropales genera
Taxa described in 1853